Taylor Forge is a defunct engineering and manufacturing company founded by J. Hall Taylor in 1900 as the American Spiral Pipe Works. It was renamed Taylor Forge & Pipe Works in 1929 and acquired by Gulf and Western in 1967. In 1984, G + W divested itself of its Taylor Forge operations to private investors, forming Taylor Forge Stainless and Taylor Forge Engineered Systems which consisted primarily of the Paola, KS facility TF acquired from Fluor Corporation in 1959.

By the early 1960s the company had general offices and works located in Cicero, Illinois (Chicago, Illinois area), and plants at Carnegie, Pennsylvania; Gary, Indiana; Houston, Texas; Somerville, New Jersey; and Hamilton, Ontario, Canada. Works and plants forged various industrial items from titanium, tungsten, magnesium, and nickel base superalloys for engineering applications. Their forged titanium products, such as discs and seamless rings for jet engines; hemispheres, elliptical closures and contoured seamless body sections were used in all U.S. intercontinental ballistic missiles of the time, such as Atlas, Minuteman, and Titan. Also it developed and manufactured bulkhead rings for spacecraft such as Mercury and Gemini.

References

Engineering companies of the United States
Manufacturing companies based in Chicago
Gulf and Western Industries
Defunct engineering companies of the United States
1967 disestablishments in Illinois
1900 establishments in Illinois
American companies established in 1900 
American companies disestablished in 1967